Moo-Moo is a chain of buffet restaurants in Moscow, Russia. 

Moo-Moo operates as a cafeteria-style restaurant and as such can be considered a fast food restaurant. The entire menu is self-service, and includes a wide variety of meats, including shashlik, as well as vegetables, soups, breads, and desserts. Most Moo-Moo restaurants operate in the Moscow area, including Arbat. Moo-Moo restaurants are decorated with a black-and-white cow motif. Continuing the theme, every meal bought receives a free milk-flavoured candy wrapped in a black-and-white cow wrapper .

The restaurant is famous for its specialty meals inspired by works of Russian literature. It attracted much controversy in 2012 for its seagull dish (inspired by Anton Chekhov's The Seagull).

The first restaurant opened on February 10, 2000, near the Frunzenskaya metro station. The network of the cafe belongs to the Russian businessman Andrei Dellos, he, as the founder, planned to create a fast food on exclusively Russian products and Russian recipe.

As of July 2022, 38 restaurants “Mu-Mu” work: 35 within Moscow and 3 in the Moscow region.

See also

 List of Russian restaurants

References

External links

Restaurant review site

Buffet restaurants
Restaurant chains in Russia
Restaurants in Moscow
Russian restaurants